Norman Liddle Brown (30 January 1885 – 9 January 1938) was an English professional footballer. An outside right or centre forward, he played for eight clubs in his career.

Career
Brown began his career with his hometown club Willington Athletic in the early 1900s. In 1904 he signed for Sunderland, for whom he made 27 Football League appearances and scored one goal.

In 1906, he left the Black Cats and played for five different clubs over a seven-year period, before joining Blackpool in 1913. In his one season with the Seasiders, he played thirteen League games and scored two goals. He retired at the end of the season.

References
Specific

General

1885 births
1938 deaths
People from Willington Quay
Footballers from Tyne and Wear
English footballers
Association football outside forwards
Willington Athletic F.C. players
Sunderland A.F.C. players
Brentford F.C. players
Luton Town F.C. players
Southend United F.C. players
Millwall F.C. players
North Shields F.C. players
Blackpool F.C. players
English Football League players